The IKF Korfball U23 World Championship, often simply known as the U23 Korfball World Championship, is an international korfball competition contested by the U23 national teams of the members of International Korfball Federation (IKF), the sport's global governing body.

Results

References

Korfball competitions